Historical or period drama is a film genre in which stories are based on historical events and famous persons. Some historical dramas attempt to accurately portray a historical event or biography, to the degree that the available historical research will allow. Other historical dramas are fictionalised tales that are based on an actual person and their deeds.

This is a list of films that are based on actual events. All films on this list are from Russian production unless indicated otherwise.

Not all films have remained true to the genuine history of the event or the characters they are portraying, often adding action and drama to increase the substance and popularity of the film. For films pertaining to the history of Near Eastern and Western civilisation, please refer to list of historical period drama films and series set in Near Eastern and Western civilization.

The action in the majority of the films is set in the region of modern Russia.

Films

See also 

 List of historical drama films
 List of war films and TV specials
 List of costume drama films
 List of Russian films
 List of Russian submissions for the Academy Award for Best Foreign Language Film
 Cinema of Russia
 Period piece
 Epic film
 Biographical film

Further reading 
 Rollberg, Peter (2016). Historical Dictionary of Russian and Soviet Cinema. Rowman & Littlefield. p. 281. ISBN 9781442268425.

Russian